The Makeover is the ninth studio album by American singer Jody Watley, released on Avitone Records. Watley recruited a diverse group of contemporary dance and electronica producers for the project, among them King Britt, DJ Spinna and 4hero. The album's vintage aesthetic, which saw her take the old and remake it as new, was likely foretold in Watley's updating of her signature classic, "Looking for a New Love", in 2005. As per the title, The Makeover contained newly recorded (and remixed) versions of some of Watley's signature classics like "Don't You Want Me" and "Friends" (re-dubbed "Friendz"), as well as new material. Additionally, Watley paid tribute to musical influences like Diana Ross, Chic and Karen Carpenter on the covers "Love Hangover", "I Want Your Love" and a medley of the Carpenters' songs, respectively.

Background
The Makeover, from its title to its photo media, was a tongue-in-cheek commentary on the ever-growing makeover culture now commonplace in contemporary society. Indeed, the album's photography (contained in the liner notes) showed Watley theatrically made-up to resemble a cosmetic surgery recipient.  These photos caused a bit of a controversy, however, as they were apparently leaked, after which various online gossip columns (most notably the New York Post's "Page Six"), had falsely reported that Watley had undergone actual cosmetic surgery. Watley jokingly discussed the controversy in the September 11, 2006 issue of the National Enquirer.

Track listings

Singles
The first single to be released from The Makeover was a downtempo cover of "Borderline", written by Reggie Lucas and an originally a 1984 hit for Madonna. Upon the single's UK release in October 2009, Watley told noted R&B writer Pete Lewis of the award-winning 'Blues & Soul': "'Borderline' is a song I've always liked. Because - even though the way it was originally recorded was very poppy - for me the song always had a melancholy side to it, which I think my version taps into."

The album's second single was "I Want Your Love", a cover of the Chic classic. The Watley cover was produced by DJ Spinna and featured Chic's own Nile Rodgers on guitar. Supported by dance mixes, the track peaked at #1 on the Hot Dance Music/Club Play chart for the week of June 16, 2007.

Personnel

Jody Watley – Vocals, backing vocals
Mark Boyce – Moog Synthesizer
Chris Brann – Keyboards, programming
Marc Mac – Piano, rhodes, Arp synthesizer, programming
Luke Parkhouse – Drums, percussion
Brad Munn – Acoustic guitars
Andy Hammill - Double bass

Hillside Stings – Strings
Nile Rodgers – Guitar
DJ Spinna – Drum programming
Selan Lerner – Keyboards
Ali Black – Assistant engineer
Rodney Lee – Programming, keyboards
Mark De Clive-Lowe – Instruments, programming
Voshaun Gotti – Flow

Production
Producers – 4hero, King Britt, Mark De Clive-Lowe, DJ Spinna, Rodney Lee, Chris Brann, Milan "The Mad Scientist" Ross 
Executive Producer – Jody Watley
Remixing producers – Bill Coleman, Vinny Troia
Project Coordinator – Van Roy for VRC Entertainment
Photography – Mike Ruiz
Make-Up – Billy B.
Hair – Ruth Roche
Special Effects Makeup – Branan Edgans
Art Direction – Jody Watley, Van Roy
Design – David Stafford

Charts

Singles

References

External links

Jody Watley albums
2006 albums